Sâmbăta de Sus is a commune in Brașov County, Transylvania, Romania. It is composed of two villages, Sâmbăta de Sus and Stațiunea Climaterică Sâmbăta (Felsőszombatfalvi üdülőtelep). Formerly part of Voila commune, these villages were split off to form a separate commune in 2003.

Geography
Sâmbăta de Sus is located in the western part of the county, on the northern slopes of the Făgăraș Mountains, in the historic Țara Făgărașului region. The river Sâmbăta flows north through the commune, discharging into the Olt River in Sâmbăta de Jos.

The commune is traversed by county road DJ104A, which connects Șinca commune,  to the east, to the town of Victoria,  to the west. County road DJ105B runs from Sâmbăta de Sus to Sâmbăta de Jos,  to the north, where it ends in national road DN1.

The early 18th-century Brâncoveanu Monastery is located in Stațiunea Climaterică Sâmbăta village. The monastery was designed in the Brâncovenesc style, and construction was sponsored by Prince Constantin Brâncoveanu, of the Ottoman-dominated Principality of Wallachia.

Natives
Laurențiu Streza

References

External links

Communes in Brașov County
Localities in Transylvania